Mercy Flights is a ground ambulance and air medical transport service based in Medford, Oregon, United States.

Mercy Flights was founded as a non-profit organization in 1949 by Bill brooks now living in Alaska and George Milligan, an air traffic controller in Medford, after a friend of his died of polio in Southern Oregon, unable to survive the long, slow ground transport to Portland.

Through fundraising efforts by schoolchildren, scouts, and others in the community, George Milligan raised enough money to buy the first aircraft, a twin engine Cessna, which was known as the bamboo bomber. The "Museum of Flight" in Seattle, Washington has Mercy Flights Retired plane "Iron Annie" on display, the Beech C-45H Expeditor was used on over 1100 missions in remote areas of Oregon, Washington and California.

A membership program was established which provided people in the community an opportunity to contribute to Mercy Flights, while ensuring that they would be financially covered in the event that they needed air medical transportation. To date, Mercy Flights has flown more than 15,000 patients throughout the western United States. Mercy Flights' ground ambulance service currently serves more than 18,000 patients each year. Mercy Flights currently has two pressurized King Air C-90s. These powerful twin-engine turboprop airplanes are pressurized up to 30,000 feet.

In 1992, Mercy Flights purchased Medford Ambulance Service, expanding operations to include ground ambulance transportation. This acquisition combined the strengths of these two community service organizations, building on the varied background and experience of each. The decision to expand in this way followed discussions with both Rogue Valley Medical Center and Providence Hospital, which established the importance of building a regional medical transportation network. In 1993, Mercy Flights acquired Rogue Ambulance, expanding its service area to include the communities of White City, Eagle Point, and Shady Cove.

In the past, the outlying communities of Prospect and Butte Falls were served by all volunteer ambulance services, which were struggling with the financial difficulties of operating ambulances in the nineties. Through a cooperative effort, these first responders and Emergency Medical Technicians (EMTs) continue to serve their communities, but now do so as a valuable part of the Mercy Flights organization. These communities benefit from the assurance of consistent, professional emergency medical services and a stronger economic base, and the EMTs benefit through increased training, improved equipment, and some financial compensation for the crucial role they play.

In 1995, Mercy Flights and Timberland entered a joint effort to provide an emergency helicopter service available to all citizens and agencies within a 150-mile radius of Medford, further expanding the type of medical transportation provided. This added resource allows rapid transport for critical patients, as well as improved access to remote areas. Mercy Flights operates a twin-engine Eurocopter BO-105. It’s fully customized with state-of-the-art in-flight medical equipment. This light, compact helicopter has four composite rotor blades to ensure manoeuvrability. All of its main systems (hydraulics, electric, fuel, lubrication) were designed to be fully redundant.

Mercy Flights sponsors an EMS specific Explorer post through the Learning for Life program of the Boy Scouts of America. Through this program, young people between the ages of 16 and 21 receive training and experience in EMS and are able to "explore" this as a career option. The young explorers are medically trained at a First Responder level and are used at large public events, scouting events, and disaster relief efforts such as the flooding problems experienced by Jackson County in January 1997.

See also
 Flight Paramedic
 Emergency medical responder levels by state
MEDEVAC
Emergency medical service
Air Ambulances in the United States
Safety of emergency medical services flights
Commission on Accreditation of Medical Transport Systems

References
 
 
 
 
 

Specific

External links
 Mercy Flights

Companies based in Medford, Oregon
Air ambulance services in the United States
Health care companies established in 1949
1949 establishments in Oregon
Medical and health organizations based in Oregon
Transport companies established in 1949